Simanova is a rural locality (a village) in Krasnovishersky District, Perm Krai, Russia. The population was 24 as of 2010. There is 1 street.

Geography 
Simanova is located 64 km southeast of Krasnovishersk (the district's administrative centre) by road. Vankova is the nearest rural locality.

References 

Rural localities in Krasnovishersky District